Xiang-Dong Kong ( born 1968, in Shanghai) is a Chinese pianist. He was one of the young musicians featured in From Mao to Mozart: Isaac Stern in China.

Kong was Gold Medalist at the 1988 Gina Bachauer International Piano Competition.  In 1992 he won the Sydney International Piano Competition. He is a 75th descendant of Confucius.

References

1968 births
Living people
Chinese classical pianists
Sydney International Piano Competition prize-winners
Prize-winners of the Paloma O'Shea International Piano Competition
Prize-winners of the Gina Bachauer International Piano Competition
Musicians from Shanghai
21st-century classical pianists
Descendants of Confucius